The 7th Carrier Air Group was part of the Royal Navy's Fleet Air Arm and was formed on 30 June 1945. It was based on the aircraft carrier  for service in the British Pacific Fleet and contained 820 Naval Air Squadron flying the Grumman TBF Avenger, 887 Naval Air Squadron and 894 Naval Air Squadron flying the Supermarine Seafire and 1700 Naval Air Squadron flying the Fairey Firefly. It was disbanded in March 1946.

See also
 List of Fleet Air Arm groups

References

Citations

Bibliography

Fleet Air Arm groups
Military units and formations established in 1945
Military units and formations disestablished in 1946